Dolikha (today Dülük) is an ancient and small episcopal city in located in Commagene, northern Syria, which is forty-one miles from Samosata,  in the province of Asia Minor. It was the scene of the murder of St. Eusebius of Samosata c. 379.

Former populated places in Syria